The Odd Fellows' Home is a historic Odd Fellows charitable home at 104 Randolph Road in Worcester, Massachusetts.  Opened in 1892, it continues to serve as a home for elderly and disabled operated by Odd Fellows Home, Inc.  Its original campus, now demolished, was listed on the National Register of Historic Places in 1980.  It is now housed in a modern facility, opened in 1990, with 100 beds, located on the same property.

Location and building history
The Odd Fellows' Home is located in northeastern Worcester, a short way east of Interstate 190 and the Greendale Mall, at the corner of Barber and Randolph Streets.  The land for the facility was donated in 1890 by Thomas Dodge, a prominent local patent lawyer, who eventually donated  in all, in order ensure "ample light and air" for the residents.

The original main building was a large three story brick building built in 1890-92 to a design by Barker & Nourse.  The most prominent feature was a projecting 5-1/2 story mansard-roofed tower with round-topped clock dormers projecting from the half story mansard.  The front bays were divided by brick pilasters, and a single-story porch extended across part of the front.  To this building's right (east) was the first major addition, added in 1902; it was a 2-1/2 story brick Classical Revival structure that increased the facility's capacity to 110 beds.  Its facade had limestone quoining, and it had a Classical Revival entry porch with Tuscan columns.

The old facility was sold in 2012 to a development firm, and was demolished in 2014 to provide added facilities to the adjacent Dodge Park Rest Home.  Materials from the building were salvaged for use in other settings.

See also
National Register of Historic Places listings in eastern Worcester, Massachusetts

References

External links
Odd Fellows Home web site

Buildings and structures in Worcester, Massachusetts
Residential buildings on the National Register of Historic Places in Massachusetts
Cultural infrastructure completed in 1890
Odd Fellows buildings in Massachusetts
National Register of Historic Places in Worcester, Massachusetts
1890 establishments in Massachusetts
Buildings and structures demolished in 2014
Demolished buildings and structures in Massachusetts